John Charlton (February 3, 1829 – 11 February 1910) was a Canadian Member of Parliament and businessman. Charlton was the Member of Parliament for Norfolk North, Ontario for 32 years until 1904. He was the author of "Parliamentary Recollections" and contributed to the North American Review.

Born in Garbuttsville, New York, John was the eldest son of Adam Charlton of Newcastle upon Tyne, England. He was first educated in McLaren Grammar School of Caledonia, New York before moving to the Springville Academy in the state. Interested in bettering himself, he studied medicine, the law, and public speaking. In 1849, at the age of twenty, he moved with his parents to Ayr, in Dumfries Township, Ontario, and became a farmer. Charlton's interest in educating himself continued led to him helping to start a library in the town of Ayr. In 1853, he moved to Lynedoch and opened a general store with his uncle and future father-in-law George Gray. Charlton married Ella Gray, daughter of George Gray of Charlotteville, Ontario, in 1854.

His next career move was to become the Canadian Manager for the lumber company of Messieurs Smith & Westover of Town of Tonawanda, New York in 1859. Charlton was first elected to the House of Commons in 1871, as member of the Liberal Party of Canada. He had strong religious views and high ideals, was a strong advocate for provincial rights, and worked for years for passage of a law affording protection to women and girls under a certain age. His speeches were considered blunt and brusque compared to his contemporaries. After a tour of the United States in 1897, Charlton served on the Joint High Commission between Great Britain, Canada and the United States from 1898 to 1899. His wife, Ella Gray, died in 1905, and Charlton entered a marriage with Cora J. Owen in 1907. He died of a stroke at his home in Lynedoch in 1910.

References

 Charlton, John.  Speeches and Addresses: Political, Literary and Religious. Toronto: Morang, 1905.
 .  Papers.  Thomas Fisher Rare Book Library, University of Toronto.  Manuscript Collection 110 includes Charlton's unpublished diaries, speeches, autobiography and manuscripts.
 Ferns, Thomas H., and Robert Craig Brown.  "John Charlton," in Dictionary of Canadian Biography (Toronto: University of Toronto Press, 1994), Vol. 13, p. 189.
 Toronto Public Library Scrapbook, microfilm T686.3, Volume, page 127

External links 
 
Future Relations of Canada & the United States New York Times, August 18, 1901

1829 births
1910 deaths
Members of the House of Commons of Canada from Ontario
Liberal Party of Canada MPs
Pre-Confederation Canadian businesspeople
People from the Regional Municipality of Waterloo
People from Monroe County, New York